Papurana celebensis, also known as the Celebes frog, is a species of true frog in the family Ranidae. Prior to being reclassified into the genus Papurana in 2020, it was referred to as "Hylarana" celebensis. It is endemic to Sulawesi (Celebes), Indonesia. It is a lowland forest species, also occurring disturbed habitats.

References

celebensis
Endemic fauna of Indonesia
Amphibians of Sulawesi
Amphibians described in 1872
Taxa named by Wilhelm Peters